Yoel Schwartz (29 September 1939 – 8 September 2022) was an Israeli Haredi Jewish rabbi, Torah scholar, and writer who published over 200 Jewish books. He was a senior lecturer at Dvar Yerushalayim yeshiva in the Jerusalem neighborhood of Har Nof, an English-speaking institute for baalei teshuva. He was also involved in attempts to revive the Sanhedrin.

Education
Schwartz studied at Kol Torah Yeshiva in Jerusalem, Ponevezh Yeshiva in Bnei Brak and Mir Yeshiva in Jerusalem. He served as the mashgiach ruchani of Yeshivas Itri.

Prizes

In 2009, he received the Moskowitz Prize for Zionism in Jerusalem for his work in establishing the "Nahal Haredi" framework for conscription of Haredi males to serve as combat troops in the IDF.

See also
Modern attempts to revive the Sanhedrin

References

External links
https://web.archive.org/web/20110113132746/http://www.moskowitzprize.com:80/eng/win_2010/schwartz_e.htm

1939 births
2022 deaths
20th-century rabbis in Jerusalem
21st-century rabbis in Jerusalem
Haredi rabbis in Israel
Ponevezh Yeshiva alumni
Authors of Rabbinic works
Moskowitz Prize for Zionism laureates